Khabib Yunich (in Uyghur; 1905–1945) was a politician, pedagogue and journalist in the Xinjiang province of Western China. He was an ethnic Tatar and a Muslim.

After returning to China from Turkey, where he studied, he organized the first Uyghur language gazette in the Ili district of Xinjiang and was its editor from 1934 to 1944. He was also the first person to organize a public library in the city of Ghulja (Kuljia). In the 1940s, he taught at the Tatar school in Ghulja.

Yüniç was one of the few leaders of a movement for Xinjiang's independence. He was also one of the composers of the Declaration of the People's Republic of East Turkistan, the first ethnic Uighur state, albeit one of the earliest satellite states of the USSR. Yüniç was also an education minister of the unrecognized state, while working as an editor of the "Free East Turkistan Gazette". He died during a typhus epidemic. The Soviet Union later dropped its support for the secessionist state, which collapsed and was reabsorbed into China.

References

1905 births
1945 deaths
Chinese Tatars
Republic of China journalists
20th century in Xinjiang
Tatar people
Writers from Xinjiang
Chinese Muslims
Chinese people of Tatar descent